The Hellfire Club is a fictional society appearing in American comic books published by Marvel Comics. The Hellfire Club often comes into confrontation with the mutant superhero team, the X-Men.  Although the Club appears to merely be an international social club for wealthy elites, its clandestine Inner Circle seeks to influence world events, in accordance with their own agenda.

The Hellfire Club was created in 1980 by the Uncanny X-Men writer/artist duo of Chris Claremont and John Byrne, who were heavily influenced by a 1966 episode of the British television series The Avengers ("A Touch of Brimstone"). The name "Hellfire Club" in fact has a historical precedent, having been a popular name for gentlemen's clubs in the 18th century. Additionally, the hierarchy of the Inner Circle is modeled on the pieces of a chess set, with Black and White sets of Kings, Queens, Bishops and Rooks.

The Hellfire Club and its Inner Circle were introduced in "The Dark Phoenix Saga", attempting to subvert the X-Men's Jean Grey. This incarnation, composed most notably of Black King Sebastian Shaw and White Queen Emma Frost, would remain prominent for many years. After their initial confrontations, the Hellfire Club and the X-Men settled into an uneasy alliance. This eventually changed as endless power struggles perpetuated a series of upheavals within the Inner Circle. The club has appeared in two X-Men animated series (X-Men: The Animated Series and Wolverine and the X-Men), both times being renamed as simply The Inner Circle, due to the aversion of using the term "hellfire" in a children's cartoon. Members of the Hellfire Club appeared in 2011's X-Men: First Class as the main villains, led by Sebastian Shaw, Emma Frost, Azazel and Riptide. The Hellfire Club’s Inner Circle also appear as the main antagonists of the second season of the television series The Gifted led by a character named Reeva Payge played by Grace Byers, and the Frost sisters played by Skyler Samuels.

Publication history
In creating the Hellfire Club, Uncanny X-Men writer Chris Claremont and artist/co-writer John Byrne drew heavily upon a 1966 episode of the British spy series The Avengers entitled "A Touch of Brimstone". In the episode, agents John Steed and Emma Peel attempt to infiltrate a secret society named after the Hellfire Club of the 18th century, whose members of the "Inner Circle" all wear period costumes. Emma Peel's guise as "the Queen of Sin", dressed in a black leather corset, would be the model for the Club's Queens, her first name even borrowed for White Queen Emma Frost. The leader of the episode's club was played by actor Peter Wyngarde, best known for his role as Jason King, forming the basis for Mastermind's new "Jason Wyngarde" identity.

The other members of Claremont and Byrne's Hellfire Club were similarly drawn from the names and faces of famous actors: Sebastian Shaw was based on actor Robert Shaw, Harry Leland on Orson Welles (who acted as Harry Lime in The Third Man and whose film Citizen Kane featured a reporter named Jed Leland), and Donald Pierce was based on Donald Sutherland (the surname referencing his Hawkeye Pierce character from M*A*S*H).

Later writers would further the references to The Avengers: Sir Patrick and Lady Diana, from the Philadelphia branch of the 1780s, are named after actors Patrick Macnee (John Steed) and Diana Rigg (Mrs. Emma Peel); conversely, the Black Queen of the London branch was revealed to be named Ms. Emma Steed.

Overview
The Hellfire Club counts among its members the most famous, wealthy, and influential members of society. Membership is passed on to descendants, and can also be earned through wealth or influence. While many accept the invitation simply for the pleasures that the Club offers, others seek wealth and influence. In fact, the purpose of the Hellfire Club is to obtain and exert power through politics and economic influence instead of outward conquest and domination. Since its foundation, the Hellfire Club has been involved in wars and assassinations to further the agendas of the Club's most powerful members.

The Club has branches in New York City, London, Hong Kong, and Paris; the various branches are all overseen by the Lord Imperial (a position long-held by Sir Gordon Phillips). Unbeknownst to most members is the Club's Inner Circle. Originally known as the Council of the Chosen, this secret group formed around Edward "Ned" Buckman, each member assuming the titles of the major chess pieces. As White King, Buckman financed Stephen Lang's revived Sentinel program with the assistance of probationary member Sebastian Shaw. Shaw, now Black Bishop, began securing allies within the Club, meeting Harry Leland, Emma Frost, and Donald Pierce, as well as his loyal assistant, Tessa. Buckman, no longer having a use for the dangerously-ambitious Shaw, ordered a Sentinel attack on Shaw and his allies, resulting in the death of Shaw's lover, Lourdes Chantel. That night, Shaw and Emma Frost purged the entire Council of the Chosen, remaking it as the Lords Cardinal and appointing themselves Black King and White Queen.

Shaw's Inner Circle soon turned their attentions to the X-Men, kidnapping several of their number. Mastermind, as Jason Wyngarde, was made a probationary member pending his subversion of the X-Men's Jean Grey. Jean Grey was in fact the Phoenix, a god-like cosmic entity who became unstable after Mastermind's psychic manipulations, turning into the Dark Phoenix. The Hellfire Club had failed, and the X-Men had taken their toll: Phoenix had driven Mastermind insane, Colossus had crippled Donald Pierce and Wolverine nearly killed Harry Leland and several guards.

Despite such setbacks, the Inner Circle continued to pursue its agenda. Shaw, using his connections to Senator Robert Kelly to initiate Project: Wideawake, secured a government contract for Shaw Industries to manufacture Sentinels, profiting from the state of fear concerning the "mutant menace" despite secretly being a mutant himself. Frost meanwhile ran the Massachusetts Academy, a prestigious preparatory school affiliated with the Hellfire Club that secretly trained a team of young mutants, known as the Hellions. The Inner Circle also underwent some personnel changes, notably the expulsion of Donald Pierce for conspiring against his mutant colleagues, and the addition of Selene as Black Queen.

Although the hierarchy of the Inner Circle goes through constant upheaval due to the competing egos and political motives of its members, it continues to exist in the same basic structure today.

Magneto briefly took the title of Grey King after Sebastian Shaw was voted out of the Inner Circle, and with Emma Frost he began plotting against Black Queen Selene, having planted Hellion Empath into Nova Roma via his relationship with New Mutant Magma prior to ousting Shaw. However, when Magneto discovered the X-Man Rogue alive and well in the Savage Land (where Magneto was visiting), Magneto abandoned the Hellfire Club and ultimately went into exile when he was rejected by Rogue when he murdered the Savage Land priestess Zaladane. Meanwhile, Emma Frost attempted to force former Hellion Firestar to rejoin the Hellions but was rebuked by Firestar and her new teammates in the New Warriors.

Disjointed, Selene exploited the chaos to launch a pre-emptive strike to slaughter the Lord Cardinals with aid from a group of young mutant "Upstarts" who were loyal to Selene. Points for each kill were awarded by the Gamesmaster and Magneto, Shaw, Pierce, and Frost were all targeted, before Selene herself was betrayed by Trevor Fritzroy and Gamemaster. During this time the Inner Circle of the London branch was working behind the American branch's back and was influencing Parliament and the secret government agency Black Air. Captain Britain (Brian Braddock) held a position for a short term on Shinobi Shaw's advisement to investigate its activities as they had mutual objectives. Excalibur collected evidence of their crimes and the Inner Circle was either arrested or went into hiding.

The Upstarts' uprising was quashed by Sebastian Shaw. He reinstated some of the old Inner Circle until he disbanded it due to his own invested interest in business pursuits. The Club still continued loosely partly due to Selene's influence, although it never had the same prestige as the original.

Sebastian Shaw again reformed a variation of the original Inner Circle with a nobler outlook posing as a force for good, which may have been a deception on his part. Tessa/Sage rejoined the Inner Circle to observe this and to assist Roberto da Costa's usurping the position of Lord Imperial which Shaw had claimed.

The Hellfire Club was next under the leadership of Roberto da Costa as the Lord Imperial aided by Sage. Sat-Yr-9 (under the guise of Courtney Ross) as the new White Queen, aided by her assassin Viper, her "Warrior White Princess". As with many members in the past, both Sat-Yr-9 and Viper have their own personal agendas.

Following M-Day, Sunspot remains as Lord Imperial, while Shaw resumes his activities, though under Sunspot's close watch. While Sat-Yr-9's whereabouts remain unknown, Viper returns to Madripoor to oversee HYDRA operations and Sage became a member of the short-lived New Excalibur, only to end up as one of the Exiles.

When the X-Men and many other powered or depowered mutants came to San Francisco, an offshoot of the Club, known as the Hellfire Cult, begins attacking mutants and "species traitors". Officially, their leadership appears to be Empath, but the real power behind the scenes is the mysterious Red Queen. Their activities draw the attention of the X-Men.

Kade Kilgore later took control of the Hellfire Club. Kilgore founded the Hellfire Academy where he recruited mutant outlaws as its faculty and started looking for students to attend this school. The Hellfire Academy serves as the direct opponent for the Jean Grey School for Higher Learning.

Organization

Lord Imperial
The Lord Imperial is not a member of the Inner Circle or any particular branch of the Hellfire Club; the Lord Imperial is the true leader of the Hellfire Club and oversees all branches of it. As such, only a few individuals have held the title. Sir Gordon Phillips, while unknown at the time, ruled as Lord Imperial for most of the club's modern history, holding the position from before the club's introduction until his death: killed by Sabertooth on a cruise ship filled with humans infected with the Legacy Virus.

 Sir Gordon Phillips
 Elias Bogan
 Sebastian Shaw
 Roberto da Costa (Sunspot)

Inner Circle
The constant intrigue, backstabbing, blackmailing and politicking that plague the Hellfire Club have resulted in many changes of the Inner Circle, as new players seek out membership in order to obtain influence, power and wealth. The following lists the membership of each incarnation of the Inner Circle and the title they held; in descending order of rank are Kings and Queens, followed by Bishops and Rooks.

The Council of the Chosen
The original Inner Circle (existing prior to the club's introduction) consisted of:

 Edward "Ned" Buckman  - White King
 Paris Seville - White Queen
 Sebastian Shaw - Black Bishop

Sebastian Shaw was instrumental in the Hellfire Club's funding of Stephen Lang's resurrected Sentinel program, but having completed his purpose, White King Ned Buckman sought to eliminate the ambitious Black Bishop. After a Sentinel attack on Shaw's beach house resulted in the death of his lover, Lourdes Chantel, Shaw and his ally Emma Frost purged the entire Council in one night and appointed themselves its Black King and White Queen.

The Lords Cardinal
Shaw renamed The Council of the Chosen as The Lords Cardinal following his takeover of the New York branch, and appointed a number of allies to key positions. Frost began running the Massachusetts Academy at this time. Jason Wyngarde, also known as Mastermind, later became a probationary member pending his subversion of the X-Men's Jean Grey into the Club's Black Queen.

 Sebastian Shaw - Black King
 Emma Frost - White Queen
 Donald Pierce - White Bishop
 Harry Leland - Black Bishop
 Jason Wyngarde (Mastermind) - A probationary member who was presumably intended for one of the two Rooks.
 Phoenix (posing as Jean Grey) - Black Queen
 Tessa - Shaw's personal aide.
 Warhawk - Associate of the Hellfire Club.

Following Mastermind's failed subversion of Jean Grey, the title of Black Queen was once again empty. Donald Pierce reached the rank of White King but was later expelled for conspiring against his mutant colleagues. New members appointed during this period were:

 Selene: - Black Queen
 Friedrich Von Roehm - Black Rook
 Emmanuel da Costa - White Rook

A truce between the Hellfire Club and the X-Men began after an encounter with Nimrod resulted in the deaths of Leland and von Roehm. This truce soon grew into a formal alliance as Storm and Magneto, as the leaders of the X-Men and Xavier's school respectively, took over the shared position of White King.

 Storm - White King (with Magneto)
 Magneto - White King, later Grey King

Storm and the X-Men would later seemingly die, leaving Magneto alone to deal with the Inner Circle. After a protracted power struggle, Magneto turned Emma Frost and Selene against Shaw and expelled him from Inner Circle, assuming both mantles as the new Grey King. Magneto, while never formally resigning, would soon withdraw from the club, after relocating to Savage Land to deal with the threat of the villainess Zaladane. Meanwhile, Selene would turn against Frost and Magneto after learning that the two had sent Empath (one of Emma's students) to Selene's Amazon fortress Nova Roma in order to subvert Selene's granddaughter Magma. Selene would create "The Upstarts", a group of young and wealthy mutants who replace the Hellfire Club. Organizing a "game" where whichever member killed the most Hellfire Club members would rule the group, Emma Frost's students in the Hellfire Club were slaughtered by Trevor Fitzroy and Emma herself put into a coma. Fitzroy also "killed" Donald Pierce and his Reavers. Magneto meanwhile, having relocated to Asteroid M, invited a young healer named Fabian Cortez and his group known as the Acolytes to stay with him. Cortez (whose power was to boost other mutants abilities) manipulated Magneto into declaring war upon the X-Men and ultimately hijacked control over a SHIELD orbital weapons platform, to blow up Asteroid M, seemingly killing Magneto. Sebastian Shaw would be "killed" by Shinobi Shaw, a young mutant who was fathered by Harry Leland but raised by Sebastian as his son. In retaliation, Empath used his powers to manipulate all of Nova Roma (including Magma) into thinking they were kidnapped victims of Selene's, who had been manipulated due to her mind control powers, into thinking they were citizens of an ancient, long lost Roman settlement in South America. Selene however, would soon fall prey to her new allies own wrath as Trevor Fitzroy and Selene's ally, the Gamemaster, turned against her and allowed Gamemaster to take control over the Upstarts.

White Rook Emmanuel da Costa was also killed around this period, though his death was unrelated to the agenda of the Upstarts. A group of immortal mutants known as the Externals, became aware of a prophecy that one of the New Mutants was destined to play a major role in the salvation of the planet. The prophecy referenced two New Mutants in particular, de Costa's son Sunspot and the New Mutant Cannonball, one of which potentially possessed the secondary mutation of immortality and the destiny of savior of mutantkind. As Cable infiltrated the New Mutants under the notion that Cannonball was to be the immortal messiah, the External's leader Gideon sought to corrupt Sunspot, who was the messiah promised in the prophecy. Already a family friend, Gideon had de Costa's secretary poison the White Rook in order to force his super-hero son to leave the New Mutants and take leadership of his family's company. When Cannonball survived a near fatal impaling (which Cable mistook as being the result of his being immortal), Gideon turned on Sunspot who was ultimately rescued by X-Force.

With exception of de Costa; all of the Hellfire Club Lord Cardinals killed by the Upstarts, later recovered. Sebastian Shaw faked his death, as did Magneto. Donald Pierce was rebuilt by Stryfe along with the rest of the Reavers, while Emma Frost recovered from her coma and repented her evil ways.

Shinobi Shaw's Upstart Inner Circle
Selene had originally planned on creating a new Inner Circle with the help of the Upstarts - among them Shinobi Shaw, son of Sebastian Shaw - but they betrayed and imprisoned her. Believing to have successfully assassinated his father, Shinobi Shaw briefly took over the New York branch of the Club, seemingly with support from the External Candra. He offered membership in his Inner Circle to Archangel, Storm, and Sunspot (also known as Roberto da Costa, son of former White Rook Emmanuel da Costa), but all declined.

 Shinobi Shaw - Black King
 Benedict Kine - White King
 Benazir Kaur - White Queen
 Reeva Payge - Black Queen
 Candra - Associate
 Cordelia Frost - Probationary member
 Ebon Knights - Shinobi Shaw's Black Guard
 Ivory Knights - Benedict Kine's White Guard

The titles of Payge and Kaur are not established. When Cordelia Frost (younger sister of Emma) applies for membership to the Inner Circle, Shinobi states that the title of White Queen is already taken.

Shinobi Shaw's actions as Black King were limited to failed attempts at extending his influence and monitoring the London branch of the Club.

The London Branch
The Hellfire Club's London branch is introduced briefly operating parallel to Shinobi's Inner Circle.  Instead of Black and White, the titles of the London Inner Circle are designated Black and Red.

 Emma Steed - Black Queen
 Margali Szardos - Red Queen
 Quentin Templeton - Black King
 Alan Wilson - Red King
 Brian Braddock (Captain Britain) - Black Bishop
 Conrad Strathdee - Red Bishop
 Jane Hampshire (possessed by Mountjoy) - Red Rook
 Rutledge - Servant

Captain Britain, having inherited club membership from his father, Sir James Braddock, was asked by Shinobi Shaw to infiltrate the London Inner Circle, as the branch's mysterious agenda surely ran counter to both their interests. The London Branch and their plans were soon brought to an end after a failed attempt to use a demon's essence to control the city. The Black Queen and Red King were taken into police custody.

Shaw's Second Circle
Sebastian Shaw, despite his apparent death, later re-emerged and retook control of the Hellfire Club in attempt to restore its former power and glory. Selene, freed from her imprisonment by the Upstarts, took under her influence a resurrected Madelyne Pryor in her quest for revenge. Shaw meanwhile attempted to ally with the AOA-exile Holocaust. Meeting in New York, Shaw proposes a reformation of the Inner Circle with the following line-up: At first operating in secret from outside the Hellfire Club (still under Shinobi Shaw's control), Sebastian's group soon reasserted control over the organization.

 Sebastian Shaw - Black King
 Selene - Black Queen
 Trevor Fitzroy - White Rook
 Madelyne Pryor - Red Queen
 Donald Pierce - Applicant for White Bishop
 Tessa - Shaw's personal aide
 Ella - Selene's personal servant
 Holocaust - Associate
 Miss Hoo - Associate

Selene's mind control over Madelyne Pryor eventually waned, and the Black Rook's allegiance soon turned to Sebastian Shaw. Concerned, Selene contacted Fitzroy and Tessa to counteract the changing balance of power. Donald Pierce returned to the Hellfire Club as a probationary member, however his failure in attaining the alien technology of Apocalypse resulted in his expulsion from the group. Pryor meanwhile had betrayed and deserted the club. Shaw, presented with a mysterious offer, decided to accept its terms and resign from the Inner Circle, advising Fitzroy to do the same.

Selene's Hellfire Club
Selene, finding herself the sole remaining member of the Inner Circle, reformed the club in her own image and allied with the ruler of Hell, Blackheart. After a confrontation with the Fantastic Four, Blackheart is imprisoned and Selene's captive Daimon Hellstrom is freed; Hellstorm then became the club's White King to ensure a balance of power and light. Selene would later successfully induct Sunspot (Roberto da Costa, son of former Black Rook Emmanuel da Costa) into the Inner Circle, offering the resurrection of his long-dead girlfriend, Julianna, who died saving his life.

 Selene - Black Queen
 Blackheart - Black King
 Daimon Hellstrom - White King
 Roberto da Costa (Sunspot) - Black Rook

It is unknown what led to the dissolution of this incarnation. The Hellfire Club was found closed and abandoned, covered in blackbriar thorns; Selene herself was trapped inside the mansion, unable to leave.

The Fifth Inner Circle
After the death of Sir Gordon Phillips at the hands of the Brotherhood of Mutants, Sebastian Shaw positioned himself as the new Lord Imperial and, as such, oversaw the entire Hellfire Club.

 Sebastian Shaw - Lord Imperial
 Roberto da Costa (Sunspot) - Black King
 Selene - Black Queen
 Sat-Yr-9 (as Courtney Ross) - White Queen
 Viper - White Warrior Princess
 Tessa - Shaw's personal aide and Sunspot's personal adviser.
 Red Lotus - Associate

Selene, despite remaining imprisoned underneath the Hellfire Club's New York mansion and not actively participating in the Inner Circle, has apparently retained her title of Black Queen. It was also revealed that Emma Frost, despite having left the club long ago and having since joined the X-Men, still retained her membership and White Queen title. Sat-Yr-9 confronts Emma Frost and, assuming her title, becomes the newest addition to the Inner Circle, bringing with her bodyguard and self-appointed "White Warrior Princess" Viper.

A confrontation with Donald Pierce leaves Sebastian Shaw gravely injured, and Sunspot takes over as Lord Imperial, which was Tessa's plan all along. Tessa left the Club, still under Sunspot's rule, and joined New Excalibur in the wake of M-Day. Shaw has since returned as the Black King, seemingly plotting to rebuild his power base.

Nova's Inner Circle

 Emma Frost
 Sebastian Shaw
 Perfection
 Cassandra Nova
 Negasonic Teenage Warhead

A mysterious new Inner Circle emerged in the pages of 'Astonishing X-Men' vol. 3. Members of this version were never given titles since they were revealed to be psionic projections created by Emma Frost at the behest of Cassandra Nova. In an attempt to free herself the X-Men, Cassandra had placed a portion of her consciousness in Frost's prior to being mentally imprisoned and launched an assault on the X-Mansion by using Emma as a Trojan horse. Other than Cassandra Nova, each member appears to represent a different aspect of Emma's past with Negasonic Teenage Warhead being a former student of hers who died in Genosha; Perfection, a manifestation of Emma's younger, evil self and Sebastian Shaw representing her time with the Hellfire Club.

Selene's second Inner Circle
Selene, finding herself once again the sole remaining member of the Inner Circle, and disappointed by the many betrayals from Sebastian Shaw and his Hellfire Club, decided it was time to rise to goddesshood, a state she believed she was destined for. To accomplish that, she specifically recruited a Coven of deadly mutants to seek revenge against all those that had betrayed her or stood in her way in the past. Together they went to the New York branch of the Hellfire Club, where she cut all ties with them by using her new Inner Circle to slaughter every person there. This Inner Circle was made up of mostly by mutants whose abilities were designed for killing. Membership consisted of:

 Blink 
 Senyaka
 Mortis
 Wither
 Eli Bard - only non-mutant member. Turned into a vampire-like creature by Selene.

The Sixth Inner Circle
Sebastian Shaw's Inner Circle eventually reemerged. Wolverine came into confrontation with a new "Inner Circle", under the false impression (by Sebastian Shaw and  "Miss Sinister") that they are behind the kidnapping of his son, Daken.

 Sebastian Shaw
 Claudine Renko (Miss Sinister)
 Mr. Castlemere
 Turner
 Peter Scholl (Leonine)
 Mercedes

The Seventh Inner Circle
In the event "Schism", there has apparently been a pro-human coup in the Hellfire Club, all mutant members have been removed, and 12-year-old supergenius Kade Kilgore has been named the new Black King. Kilgore then called together a cabal of prepubescent geniuses to secretly rule the Hellfire Club and eradicate mutantkind, then proceeding to poison the other remaining Hellfire Club members, making them the sole leadership. Kade Kilgore later had a change of heart and began recruiting mutants to his side to train the newly manifested mutants at the Hellfire Academy. The Hellfire Academy is destroyed by the staff of the Jean Grey School.

 Kade Kilgore - Black King. A twelve-year-old sociopath who is also the leader of the group. 
 Doctor Maximilian Frankenstein (formerly Baron Maximilian von Katzenelnbogen) - Black Bishop. Descendant of Victor Frankenstein. He was responsible for creating the Krakoa that the X-Men befriended and the Krakoas that defended the unnamed island where the Hellfire Academy is located.
 Manuel Enduque - White King. He is well-versed in weaponry with his family reportedly being a dynasty of slavers in Africa with Manuel having strangled his own father to death, thus resulting in him taking control of the business.
 Wilhemina Kensington - White Queen. She is an eleven year old with a love of martial arts and beauty pageants who inherited the company after her mother died. She is also both psychopathic and sociopathic, having killed human guards and alien warriors and is also alleged to have mutilated both cats and penguins. 

 Associates:
 Sabretooth
 Ezekiel Stane 
 Kid Blackheart 
 Cordelia Frost
 Szandor Shaw
 Kevin Krask
 Kenneth Krask
 Wolfgang von Roehm

The Eighth Inner Circle
Sebastian Shaw has since regained control of the Hellfire Club and in an attempt to restore its former power and glory, decided to ally himself with Magneto and his X-Men branch to form a new Inner Circle.

 Sebastian Shaw - Black King
 Briar Raleigh - Black Bishop - Magneto's former associate and the only non-mutant within the Inner Circle
 Monet St. Croix - White Queen
 Black Tom Cassidy - White Bishop

The Ninth Inner Circle
Eventually Emma Frost decided to rid of Shaw, by spiking his wine with a paralytic agent she made sure there was no way for him to release his body's absorbed energies which overloaded his Mothervine-induced secondary mutation, resulting in his death. She then reformed the Inner Circle in her image and using Vanisher as her personal transportation, she worked behind the scenes to get the X-Men to handle certain affairs.

Black King: Emma Frost
White King: Mystique
Black Bishop: Elixir
White Bishop: Marrow

The Tenth Inner Circle
With mutants congregating on Krakoa, Kade Kilgore is able to retake control of the Hellfire Club branch in New York City. Opting later to rename themselves as "Homines Verendi", a Latin name which roughly translates to "man must be revered and feared", Kade and his group (Maximilian Frankenstein, Manuel Enduque and Wilhemina Kensington) recruited Taiwanese millionaire and anti-mutant activist, Chen Zhao and stands poised ready to tear down the new age of mutantkind as they are involved in the Krakoans' problems.

With each of the founding members already in possession of massive fortunes, they succeeded in taking over Madripoor, an island in Southeast Asia, and are using it as its base of power. While it is unknown whether or not the royal family of Madripoor has been detained, fled or simply murdered, it's clear that the lawless island is no longer a safe haven for mutants. Once used as a base of operations for the X-Man Wolverine while using the alias “Patch,” Madripoor has now degenerated into a country that is openly hostile toward mutants and has even gone so far as to offer its citizens payment for killing mutants. It's almost become a dark reflection of Krakoa and everything that it stands for and recruited long-time X-Men foe Donald Pierce to act as Madripoor’s official representative to the United Nations.

They also secretly aid Hellfire Club member Sebastian Shaw in the murder of Kitty Pryde. Shaw paid Verendi to participate in his scheme to get Kitty alone on Verendi's ship so that he could ensnare her in Krakoan vines and sink her with the ship.

 Kade Kilgore - Black King
 Manuel Enduque - White King
 Chen Zhao - White Bishop
 Maximillian Frankenstein - Black Bishop
 X-Cutioner
 Donald Pierce 
 Hate-Monger
 Yellowjacket/Darren Cross

Members
The following characters are members of the Hellfire Club, many of them being extremely influential, but were not part of any of the Inner Circle incarnations mentioned above. Membership is either hereditary, or obtained through personal invitation from the branch's King. Known members include:

 Warren Worthington Jr. and Kathryn Worthington (both deceased) - invited by Ned Buckman
 Howard Stark (deceased) - invited by Ned Buckman
 Sir James Braddock (deceased) - invited by Ned Buckman, former Black Bishop of the London Branch, left the Inner Circle when his inventions were used for anti-mutant purposes.
 Senator Robert Kelly (deceased)
 Warren Worthington III (Angel) - inherited membership from his father.
 Candace "Candy" Southern (deceased)
 Elizabeth Braddock (Psylocke) - inherited membership.
 James Braddock Jr. - inherited membership.
 Berhard Van Ostamgen - failed entry into Inner Circle
 Ronald Parvenue
 Dwayne Taylor (Night Thrasher) (deceased)
 Anthony Stark (Iron Man) - inherited membership from his father
 Norman Osborn (Green Goblin)
 Bianca LeNeige
 Vance Astrovik
 Oliver Ryland - Elias Bogan's protégé
 The Kingmaker
 Rachel Summers - White Warrior Princess, invited by Emma Frost
 Lady Jacqueline Falsworth-Crichton - inherited membership
 Angus Munroe - deceased

Past members
 Philadelphia, 1780/81: Sir Patrick Clemens (King title), Lady Diana Knight (Queen title), Lady Grey (Queen title), Elizabeth Shaw-Worthington, Major General Wallace Worthington, Commander Clinton
 London, 1859: Lord Braddock, Mr. Shaw (Sebastian Shaw's great-grandfather and Cornelius Shaw's father)
 Boston, 1872/74: Anton Pierce (Member of the Inner Circle)
 London, 1915: Brigadier-General Cornelius Shaw, Sir Harry Manners, Waltham Pierce

In Runaways #10, Emma Frost tells Cyclops that the Hellfire Club had once reached out for the Hayeses, though the attempt went awry because the Hayeses were "sadistic monsters".

Staff
The Hellfire Club has employed a large number of mostly-anonymous armed guards. A few have been named:

 Wade Cole
 Angelo Macon
 Murray Reese
 Samuel Guthrie (Cannonball)
 Richard Salmons
 Randall Chase
 Chet Andrews

Cole, Macon and Reese were savagely wounded by Wolverine in the Hellfire Club's first confrontation with the X-Men. They would return to duty as cyborgs before leaving the Club to join Lady Deathstrike in seeking revenge against Wolverine, eventually joining the Reavers.  Sam Guthrie worked as a Hellfire guard for a brief period before joining the New Mutants as Cannonball. Kade Kilgore also recruited two survivors of private military company Blackguard, who were augmented with adamantium skeletons, and laser claws as his personal bodyguards.

The Hellfire Club also employs a number of servants, escorts and strippers. Sharon Kelly was a waitress at the New York branch who was chosen by Sebastian Shaw to seduce Senator Robert Kelly. The couple quickly married, but soon afterwards Sharon was killed in a battle involving the X-Men, further fueling her husband's hatred for mutants.

Massachusetts Academy

The Hellfire Club was aligned with the prestigious prep school the Massachusetts Academy, run by White Queen Emma Frost, for a number of years. In addition to its large, traditional, student body, the Academy secretly trained a team of young mutants known as the Hellions. Due to their affiliation with the Club, the Hellions were often present at its social functions. This group would entertain a rivalry with Professor Charles Xavier's students at the time, the New Mutants.

After the death of the Hellions in an attack orchestrated by the Upstarts, Emma Frost left the Hellfire Club. Re-aligning herself with Professor Xavier, the Massachusetts Academy became the new site for Xavier's School for Gifted Youngsters and a new class, known as Generation X.

Hellfire Academy
The seventh incarnation of the Hellfire Club have since founded the Hellfire Academy, a rival to the Jean Grey School for Higher Learning. It is located on an unnamed island. According to Kade Kilgore, the purpose of recruiting newly empowered mutants is to train them to be supervillains so he can then profit from the fear generated by them through his Sentinel program. Staff outside the Hellfire Club's leadership include:

 Mystique - Headmistress who also teaches Intro to Evil. Joined in Wolverine and the X-Men #20.
 Sabretooth - Headmaster. Joined in Wolverine and the X-Men #3.
 Dog Logan - Brother of Wolverine. He teaches physical education. Joined in Wolverine and the X-Men #29.
 Dr. Xanto Starblood - Self-proclaimed Extreme Zoologist who teaches Xenobiology. Joined in Wolverine and the X-Men #30
 Husk - Former X-Man. She is the lunch lady and librarian. Joined sometime after Wolverine and the X-Men #19.; later rejoined X-Men
 Lord Deathstrike - Brother of Lady Deathstrike who works as a recruited resourcer. Joined in Wolverine and the X-Men #20.
 Master Pandemonium - He teaches Hell Literature. Joined in Wolverine and the X-Men #20.
 Madame Mondo - Female member of the Spinless Ones from the Mojoverse. She works as the Public Relations teacher. Joined in Wolverine and the X-Men #20.
 Sauron - He works as a science teacher. Joined in Wolverine and the X-Men #20.
 Silver Samurai -The son of the original Silver Samurai who works as a designer. Joined in Wolverine and the X-Men #20.
 The Philistine - Joined in Wolverine and the X-Men #20.
 Toad - Joined in Wolverine and the X-Men #30.; left in Wolverine and the X-Men #33; later rejoined X-Men
 Wendigo - He works as a Danger Room Instructor. Joined in Wolverine and the X-Men #20.

The students of the Hellfire Academy include:

 Broo - Joined in Wolverine and the X-Men #30; later rejoined X-Men
 Glob Herman - Joined prior to Wolverine and the X-Men #18 
 Infestation - Joined in Wolverine and the X-Men #31 
 Mudbug - Joined in Wolverine and the X-Men #20
 Oya - Joined in Wolverine and the X-Men #29; left in Wolverine and the X-Men #33; later rejoined X-Men
 Kid Omega - Joined in Wolverine and the X-Men #30; left in Wolverine and the X-Men #32; later rejoined X-Men
 Snot - Joined in Wolverine and the X-Men #31
 Tin Man - Joined in X-Men vol. 3 #41

Hellfire Trading Company
In the wake of the establishment of the mutant nation of Krakoa in the 2019 series House of X and Powers of X, Emma Frost reforms the Club and reorganized it into the Hellfire Trading Company, the distribution arm for the Krakoan drugs produced by the mutant nation-state. Sailing out of Hellfire Bay, its ships the Marauder, the Upstart and the Mercury perform public delivery of mutant goods, while also smuggling the drugs illicitly and freeing mutants from unfriendly nations. The company is run by a new Inner Circle which is compose of a triple dynasty of black, white and red Hellfire royalty.

 White Palace
White Queen: Stepford Cuckoos: Emma Frost (formerly)
White Bishop: Christian Frost
White Knight: Callisto
Blackstone
Black Queen: Lourdes Chantel; Sebastian Shaw (formerly Black King)
Black Bishop: Shinobi Shaw
Black Knights: Andrea and Andreas Strucker
Red Keep
 Red Queen: Katherine Pryde
 Red Bishop: Lucas Bishop

Other versions

Age of Apocalypse
In the alternate universe known as the Age of Apocalypse, the Hellfire Club was not active and was possibly decimated by the forces of Apocalypse. Its closest counterpart was Heaven, Warren Worthington III's nightclub that formed a neutral zone from the genetic conflict that boiled outside. Sebastian Shaw meanwhile served as a member of Apocalypse's court. Donald Pierce also became a servant of Apocalypse, and lead the techno-organic-infected Reavers. On the other side of the conflict, Emma Frost served as part of the Human High Council, having been stripped of her powers through a lobotomy. Jason Wyngarde, a victim of the Sugar Man's genetic experiments, had become one of Forge's Outcasts.

After the ascension of Weapon X, Sebastian Shaw remade Heaven into his image and renamed the nightclub as Hellfire Club all the while trying to gain power.

Bishop's Future
The Hellfire Club retained its position as one of the world's major powers in the future timeline of Bishop. The Club is ruled by Anthony Shaw, a descendant of Sebastian Shaw; he also has an illegitimate son, Trevor Fitzroy. (Fitzroy would later travel back in time, bringing him into conflict with his forefathers Shinobi and Sebastian Shaw.) Malcolm, a colleague of Bishop and member of the Xavier Security Enforcers (X.S.E.), was also a member of the Club.

Clan Hellfire
In a future dominated by Trevor Fitzroy, calling himself The Chronomancer, one of the forces opposing his rule is Clan Hellfire, led by a Samara Shaw.

X-Men: Ronin
In one alternate reality in which the X-Men are based in Japan, the Hellfire Club is ruled by Professor Xavier. The White Queen Emma Frost is a junior member who, along with Tessa, believe Xavier to be their biological father. The Club controls the Shadowcat Clan of ninjas, which includes Pyro, Iceman and Colossus.

Marvel Noir
In X-Men Noir, the Hellfire Club is an exclusive S&M club owned by Sebastian Shaw, and is plundered early on by Beast, Cyclops and Iceman.

Ultimate Marvel
Within the Hellfire Club of the Ultimate Marvel Universe is an Inner Circle led by Sebastian Shaw (with other notable members being Xavier spy Gerald Lavine, and Shaw's son Shinobi) who worship a pagan "Phoenix God". Believing the Phoenix to be incarnated in the body of X-Man Jean Grey, the Club quietly funded Professor Charles Xavier as she developed under his tutelage. Jean however underwent a mental breakdown, and stole the Inner Circle's bank access codes and wiped their minds.

A group called the Church of Shi'ar Enlightenment later approached the Xavier Institute, claiming the Hellfire Club was a breakaway sect, and asking to examine whether or not Jean really is the Phoenix God. However, Lilandra's assistant Gerald Lavine was revealed to be an operative of the Hellfire Club and working for Shinobi Shaw, who is also dating Emma Frost, headmistress of the Academy of Tomorrow and secretly a member of the Hellfire Club.

In other media

Television
 The Inner Circle Club appears in X-Men: The Animated Series, consisting of Sebastian Shaw, Jason Wyngarde, Emma Frost, Donald Pierce, and Harry Leland. Following a cameo appearance in the episode "The Phoenix Saga - Part IV", they attempt to brainwash Jean Grey into joining them during the four-part episode "The Dark Phoenix". After being foiled, Shaw, Pierce, and Frost escape while Wyngarde is left catatonic and Leland goes missing following a fight with Wolverine.
 The Inner Circle appears in Wolverine and the X-Men, consisting of Sebastian Shaw, Harry Leland, Donald Pierce, Selene, Emma Frost, and the Stepford Cuckoos. Similarly to the Ultimate Marvel incarnation, this version of the group seek to gain the Phoenix Force's power. After spending most of the series infiltrating the X-Men to locate Jean Grey, Frost kidnaps her so the Inner Circle can perform a ritual to extract the Phoenix Force and place it into the Stepford Cuckoos. However, they are unable to control it, leading to Leland and Pierce being killed by falling debris while Frost subdues Shaw and Selene before sacrificing herself to release the Phoenix Force into space.
 The Inner Circle appears in Marvel Anime: X-Men, consisting of Jason Wyngarde; Rat (voiced by Manabu Sakamaki in the Japanese version and by Michael Sinterniklaas in the English dub), who can project metal discs from his body; Marsh (voiced by Yuichi Nakamura in the Japanese version and by Mary Elizabeth McGlynn in the English dub), who can dissolve into liquid; and Neuron / White Bishop (voiced by Yutaka Aoyama in the Japanese version and by Dave Wittenberg in the English dub), who possesses a shell and can amplify a target's senses via strips from his body. Additionally, Harry Leland and Emma Frost appear as members of the group in flashbacks. Following a failed attempt to manipulate Jean Grey into using the Phoenix Force for their purposes before she sacrificed herself to stop them, the Hellfire Club attempt to use a reality-warping mutant named Takeo Sasaki. However, Rat, Marsh, and Neuron are killed by the X-Men while Wyngarde is killed by Takeo.
 A live-action television series titled Hellfire was in development at 20th Century Fox Television and Marvel Television, with an early 2017 airdate. However, on July 12, 2016, Variety reported that the project is no longer moving forward.
 The Hellfire Club appears in The Gifted, consisting of Reeva Payge, the Frost sisters, Andy Strucker, Lorna Dane, Fade, and Sage. Under Payge, this version of the group pursues mutant liberation.

Film
 The Hellfire Club appeared in X-Men: First Class, led by Sebastian Shaw and consisting of Emma Frost, Azazel, Riptide, and Angel Salvadore. This version of the group seeks to cause World War III to accelerate mutant evolution and create a new world order with mutants as Earth's dominant species and Shaw as their leader. To this end, they manipulate American and Soviet government officials into instigating the Cuban Missile Crisis, prompting CIA agent Moira MacTaggert to supervise the initial formation of the X-Men to oppose them. Ultimately, Shaw is killed by Erik Lehnsherr, who unites the remaining Hellfire Club members under his leadership.
 The Hellfire Club were originally planned to return in Dark Phoenix, consisting of Frost, Harry Leland, Friedrich von Roehm, the Strucker Twins, Shinobi Shaw, and the Red Lotus Gang, but they were ultimately cut from the film.

Video games
 The Hellfire Club appear in X-Men, with Sebastian Shaw as a prominent member and boss.
 The Hellfire Club appear in X-Men: Gamesmaster's Legacy, with Shinobi Shaw as a prominent member and boss.
 The Hellfire Club appear in Wolverine: Adamantium Rage, with Selene and Shinobi Shaw as prominent members.
 The Hellfire Club appear in Marvel Avengers Alliance, with Selene and Sebastian Shaw as prominent members, Emma Frost as a former member, and various foot soldiers as minor members.

References

External links
 Hellfire Club at Marvel.com
 Hellfire Club at Marvel Wiki
 Hellfire Academy at Marvel Wiki

Villains in animated television series
Characters created by Chris Claremont
Characters created by John Byrne (comics)
Fictional clubs
Fictional organizations in Marvel Comics
Fictional organized crime groups
Marvel Comics supervillain teams
Video game bosses
X-Men supporting characters